The 2022 Judo Grand Slam Kazan was originally scheduled to be held in Kazan, Russia, from 20 to 22 May 2022. On 25 February, the International Judo Federation cancelled the competition in Russia in reaction to the Russian invasion of Ukraine.

References

External links
 

2022 IJF World Tour
2022 Judo Grand Slam
Judo
Judo
Judo Grand Slam
Judo Grand Slam